Biersack may refer to:

In music:
 Biersack, the first incarnation of American rock band Black Veil Brides
 Andy Biersack, lead vocalist of Black Veil Brides
 Khaled Biersack, former drummer of American rock band Falling in Reverse
 Anton Biersack, German composer and music educator